Saiz is a Spanish family name. The Real Academia Española establishes that the name be written without an acute accent.

Federico Saiz (1912–1989), Spanish and Basque footballer
José Ángel Saiz Meneses (born 1956), Spanish archbishop of the Catholic Church
Manolo Saiz (born 1959), the team manager of Spanish professional road bicycle racing teams
Miguel Saiz (born 1949), Argentine politician, governor of Río Negro Province
Odorico Leovigildo Saiz Pérez O.F.M. (1912–2012), Peruvian Bishop of the Catholic Church
Samuel Saiz (born 1991), Spanish footballer
Sebas Saiz (born 1994), Spanish basketball player

References

Spanish-language surnames